Trino is an Indo-Malayan masculine given name. Notable persons with that name include:
 Trisno Hendradi, an air vice-marshal of Indonesian Air Force
 Trisno Soemardjo (1916-1969), Indonesian writer, translator, and painter
 Trisno Ishak (born 1978), Singaporean musician and teacher